was a district located in Hiroshima Prefecture, Japan.

As of 2003, the district had an estimated population of 21,448 and a density of 23.00 persons per km2. The total area was 932.44 km2.

Former towns and villages
 Hiwa
 Kuchiwa
 Saijō
 Takano
 Tōjō

Merger
 On March 31, 2005 - the towns of Hiwa, Kuchiwa, Saijō, Takano and Tōjō, along with the town of Sōryō (from Kōnu District), were merged into the expanded city of Shōbara.

Former districts of Hiroshima Prefecture